Stow Park railway station was located in Lincolnshire on the line between Lincoln and Gainsborough. It closed in 1961.

References

Disused railway stations in Lincolnshire
Former Great Northern and Great Eastern Joint Railway stations
Railway stations in Great Britain opened in 1849
Railway stations in Great Britain closed in 1864
Railway stations in Great Britain opened in 1867
Railway stations in Great Britain closed in 1961
1849 establishments in England